A hydrocolloid dressing is an opaque or transparent dressing for wounds. A hydrocolloid dressing is biodegradable, breathable, and adheres to the skin, so no separate taping is needed.

The active surface of the dressing is coated with a cross-linked adhesive mass containing a dispersion of gelatin, pectin and carboxymethyl cellulose together with other polymers and adhesives forming a flexible wafer. In contact with wound exudate, the polysaccharides and other polymers absorb water and swell, forming a gel. The gel may be designed to drain, or to remain within the structure of the adhesive matrix.

The moist conditions produced under the dressing are intended to promote fibrinolysis, angiogenesis and wound healing, without causing softening and breaking down of tissue. The gel which is formed as a result of the absorption of wound exudate is held in place within the structure of the adhesive matrix. Most hydrocolloid dressings are waterproof, allowing normal washing and bathing.

Uses 
 
Hydrocolloid dressings are used to treat uninfected wounds. Dressings may be used, under medical supervision, even where aerobic infection is present; the infection should be treated appropriately.

The dressing is applied to a cleaned wound. Hydrocolloid patches are sometimes used on the face for acne. Smaller sizes are used on acne, not only to get rid of acne, but to avoid acne scars. They are also used to secure nasogastric tubes or CPAP masks to the patient's face. Hydrocolloid dressings are used for pressure ulcers (also known as bed sores).

Effectiveness
The results of meta-analyses indicate no significant difference in healing rates between hydrocolloid dressings and other dressings (including simple dressings) for venous ulcers, or for diabetic foot ulcers.

There is tentative but unclear evidence for hydrocolloid dressings for superficial and partial thickness burns. Hydrocolloid dressings were, however, superior to other substrates (i.e., alginate, film, gauze, hydrofiber, silicone) for treating skin graft donor sites.

References

External links
 Fact Sheet on Chronic Wounds, Institute for Quality and Efficiency in Health Care (last updated April 4, 2012)

Medical dressings